Guangzhou Bridge is a bridge crossing the Pearl River in Guangzhou, Guangdong province, China.

History
Completed in 1985, the bridge was the third to be built across the Pearl River in Guangzhou.

The 1240 metre bridge carries Guangzhou Avenue across the river and over the eastern tip of Ersha Island, connecting Kecun in Haizhu District with Zhujiang New Town in Tianhe.

References

Bridges in Guangzhou
Bridges over the Pearl River (China)
Bridges completed in 1985